Cartoon Planet is an American animated variety show that originally ran from 1995 to 1998 and 2012 to 2014 on Cartoon Network. A spin-off of Space Ghost Coast to Coast, the series centered on Space Ghost recruiting his imprisoned evil nemesis Zorak and his loud and dimwitted archenemy Brak to assist him in hosting a variety show.

Cartoon Planet began as an hour-long block of cartoons hosted by Space Ghost, Zorak, and Brak. They would introduce full cartoons from the Turner Entertainment library, such as old theatrical shorts and Hanna-Barbera cartoons, including the original 1960s Space Ghost episodes. The host segments were often original songs and ad-libbed skits. New material ceased being made in 1997, and most of the songs and skits were re-packaged into 22 half-hour episodes without classic cartoon clips.

Original series 
Each episode included segments such as "Brak's School Daze," "Zorak's Horror Scopes," "Poets' Corner," "Brak's Monday Ratings Report," "The Top 5 Cartoon Countdown" (discontinued in 1997 after the show's Saturday-morning slot was shortened to a half-hour), "Vacation Spots Around the Universe" (pieced together from clips of Ultra 7 episodes; at the time Turner owned the distribution rights to a dub created in 1985), "Messages from Outer Space" (also from Ultra 7, featuring the Hot Dog Men), "Mailbag Day", readings from "The Cartoon Planet Storybook," messages from Count Floyd (Joe Flaherty's local public-access television cable TV horror movie host from SCTV; the segments were originally shown on Hanna-Barbera's The Completely Mental Misadventures of Ed Grimley), "Learning to Talk Italian," Nuggets of Joy from Zorak," "Zorak's Helpful Hints," and "Cooking with Brak."

The show also had short live-action segments featuring producer Andy Merrill wearing an ill-fitting Space Ghost costume doing various things like visiting a petting zoo, getting a haircut (although he kept his mask on), playing tennis, or visiting a gift shop. Intros of the show during the early years featured Merrill in the costume performing an amateur dance to the mambo-style theme music, or sitting in a chair reading a newspaper, falling asleep to lullaby music.

For the first season of the show, the opening and closing theme songs were instrumental excerpts from "No One Knows My Plan" and "The End of the Tour" by They Might Be Giants.

Clips of numerous cartoons from the Turner library would often pop up spontaneously during segments of the show, especially during the music videos. These included Tom and Jerry, Popeye, Tex Avery cartoons, pre-August 1948 Looney Tunes/Merrie Melodies shorts, 2 Stupid Dogs, The Flintstones, The Jetsons, and other classic Hanna-Barbera cartoons. Clips from other Turner-owned properties were used as stock footage as well.

At the time, head writer/producer Pete Smith described Cartoon Planet "as a cross between The Sonny & Cher Comedy Hour, The Electric Company, and recess at the Richard M. Nixon School for Wayward Boys. ...Cartoon Planet skillfully steers clear of any semblance of sophisticated humor. Forced by network muckity-mucks to air his dirty spandex in front of millions of impressionable young minds, Space Ghost dragged a reluctant Zorak and a confused Brak into the treacherous waters of sketch comedy."

Cartoon Planet resulted in three soundtrack CDs: Modern Music for Swinging Superheroes in 1996 (a non-commercial promotional album), Space Ghost's Musical Bar-B-Que in 1997, and Space Ghost's Surf & Turf, the latter two published by Rhino Entertainment) in 1998. The albums consisted of songs and dialogue skits with different background music not used in the show.

Revival series 
The revival of the series premiered on March 30, 2012 and ended on February 8, 2014, featuring a different format from the original series. Due to budget restrictions, Space Ghost did not appear in the revival, thus leaving Brak and Zorak to host the show as "roommates together in their own, stupid little apartment" (despite this, Brak made a mini clone of Space Ghost in one episode). Instead of classic 1960s-era cartoons being showcased, the revival featured Cartoon Network's original programming, mostly Cartoon Cartoons, from the mid-1990s to late 2000s. Also, Zorak is not trapped behind a console, instead usually playing video games. Sometimes Zorak will get interrupted by Brak, causing him to lose the game.

Airing in a format based on The Cartoon Cartoon Show, the revival aired a variety of classic Cartoon Network shows in 7 or 11-minute segments per-cartoon. This allowed for four or five different cartoons to be aired in the blocks one hour timeslot.

In October 2012, Cartoon Planet celebrated Cartoon Network's 20th birthday to which it released a special two-minute song sung by Brak. The song paid tribute to the shows throughout the network's history.

There have also been holiday-themed episodes, featuring several of the Cartoon Network programming presented in a holiday-themed episode, including Halloween and Christmas.

Starting on January 11, 2013, several Cartoon Network shows that have been short-lived, permanent hiatus, canceled, or officially ended joined up to Cartoon Planet's programming block starting with Robotomy, Secret Mountain Fort Awesome, and The Problem Solverz, all of which have since been removed in the transition back to the Cartoon Cartoon format. Other short-lived series including  Whatever Happened to... Robot Jones, Sheep in the Big City, Mike, Lu & Og,  Time Squad, and Squirrel Boy did not air on the block.

Starting on April 12, 2013, the block began airing YTV, Teletoon, and Warner Bros. Animation programming in which the first were Scaredy Squirrel, Almost Naked Animals, and Tom and Jerry Tales, breaking the show's tradition of only airing Cartoon Network original programming. They were subsequently removed. From June 27, 2013 to August 9, 2013, the block aired on Thursdays at 1:30 pm ET. On August 30, 2013, the block ran on a Friday night for the last time before it was replaced by Pizza Night with Pizza Steve. It aired on Saturdays at 11:30 am ET and Sundays at 11:00 am ET since September 7, 2013. Also, on November 4, 2013, the block started airing on weekdays at 2:00 pm ET. 

The revival was animated in Flash, rather than cel animation, like the original Space Ghost series (several cels, mainly Brak's, were duplicated in Flash). It also included stop motion scenes, such as the "Make You Go Splat!" music video.

Skits 
The following are some of the skits that appeared on the 2012 revival:
 Advertisements – Fake advertisements for made-up products which the show indicates as "Not Real". On rare occasions, two advertisements were shown. The first advertisement aired was for "Bushido Potatoes".
 Music Video – Original songs sung by Brak and Zorak. The first song was "Pizza Song", which received positive reviews and internet fame. Zorak also sang in his first music video "Make You Go Splat!" which received internet fame as well.
 Zorak's Poetry Beat – Series of poems told by Zorak involving ridiculous items and nonsense lyrics. In one episode, Brak recited the poetry segment because Zorak did not feel like it. The first poem was "Ode to a Diseased Chimpanzee".
 Brak's Comedy Jokes – This segment featured Brak telling jokes to the audience. In one episode, Zorak replaces Brak in the segment now renamed "Zorak's Comedy Jokes" telling jokes which are black comedy jokes involving the misfortunes of the people that the joke is centered on.
 Dating Tips with Brak – Brak gives out (usually bad) dating tips to the audience. At the end of the each skit, he says "And that's a tip from me...".
 What's in my Mouth? – A rare segment in which Brak opens his mouth a little bit while saying "Aaaah" and Zorak had to guess what was in it. Usually, the objects are gross (such as a piece of dental cotton from five weeks ago).
 Make Stuff Happen on the T.V. – A segment in which Brak and Zorak are watching television and they interact with the programs by poking the characters on the screen, commenting to each other, voicing them, and even giving them root beer (Brak).
 Zorak Video Game Chats – A segment in which Zorak reviews a video game on his Zbox, which indicates that the games are not real. One example of a reviewed game is Pasta Grandma.
 Clones – A one-off skit reminiscent of the skits done on the original show. In on skit, Brak clones himself, Zorak, and even Space Ghost. The clones are smaller, and have their voices provided by Andy Merrill's daughter. The skit continued with the little Braks singing the opening theme for the modern show.

Series featured

Final programming 
 Camp Lazlo (2012–14)
 Chowder (2012–14)
 Codename: Kids Next Door (2012–14)
 Courage the Cowardly Dog (2012–14)
 Dexter's Laboratory (2012–14)
 The Grim Adventures of Billy & Mandy (2012–14)
 The High Fructose Adventures of Annoying Orange (2013–14)
 Johnny Bravo (2012–14)
 Johnny Test (2013–14)
 MAD (2013–14)
 The Marvelous Misadventures of Flapjack (2012–14)
 The Powerpuff Girls (1998 series) (2012–14)

Programming not aired in 2014 

 Almost Naked Animals (2013)
 Cow and Chicken (2012–13)
 Ed, Edd n Eddy (2012–13)
 Evil Con Carne (2012–13)
 Foster's Home for Imaginary Friends (2012–13)
 The Garfield Show (2013)
 Grim & Evil (2012–13)
 I Am Weasel (2012–13)
 My Gym Partner's a Monkey (2012–13)
 The Problem Solverz (2013)
 Robotomy (2013)
 Scaredy Squirrel (2013)
 Secret Mountain Fort Awesome (2013)
 Tom and Jerry Tales (2013)

Episode list

Broadcast history 
The show's first run was from 1995 to 1998, premiering on TBS in 1995 and then moving to Cartoon Network later that year. New material stopped being made around 1997 and the show was repackaged into 22 half hour episodes, consisting entirely of songs and skits. From September 24 to October 28, 2005, Cartoon Network briefly revived the show on its Adult Swim block, where it ran at 5:30 am Eastern time. The series ran again on Adult Swim from July 8 to October 29, 2006, on Sundays at 5:30 am Eastern time. The reason for the show's disappearance from 2001 to 2004 was due to Cartoon Network temporarily losing the rights of all the music videos to Rhino Records, who produced the soundtracks. Often, Cartoon Planet skits would be played after an 11-minute Space Ghost Coast to Coast episode in 2000 and 2001 as a time filler. The Cartoon Planet skits aired again on September 24, 2021, as part of Adult Swim's Pete Smith Day marathon. There are no plans for a DVD release of the series, but a few segments are included on the Volume One DVD release of The Brak Show.

References

External links 

 
 

1990s American animated television series
1990s American children's comedy television series
1990s American variety television series
1995 American television series debuts
1998 American television series endings
2010s American animated television series
2010s American children's comedy television series
2010s American variety television series
2012 American television series debuts
2014 American television series endings
American animated television spin-offs
American children's animated comedy television series
American flash animated television series
American television series revived after cancellation
American television series with live action and animation
American animated variety television series
Cartoon Network original programming
English-language television shows
Space Ghost Coast to Coast
Space Ghost television series
Television programming blocks in the United States
Television series by Williams Street